Bharatgad Fort  is a fort located 18km from Malvan, in Sindhudurg district, of Maharashtra. This fort is located on the southern bank of Gad river or Kalaval creek. The fort is spread over an area of 4-5 acres and covered with mango orchard.

History
Shivaji Maharaj visited this place in 1670 but due to less availability of water on the Masure hill, he abandoned the site for building the fort. In 1680 the Wadikar Phonda Sawant decided to built the fort. The fort was completed in 1701.  In 1748 Tulaji Angre, the son of Kanhoji Angre tried to captured the fort. In 1818, Captain Hutchinson captured this fort and found that the well on the fort was devoid of water.

How to reach
The nearest town is Malvan which is 526 km from Mumbai. The base village of the fort is Masure. The Bharatgad and Bhadwantgad forts can be visited in a single day. There are good hotels at Malvan, now tea and snacks are also available in small hotels on the way to Masure.

Places to see
The gates and bastion are in good state. This fort is a private property. This fort has 9 bastions. the entire fort is protected by 20feet wide and 10feet deep moat. The balekilla is in the center of the fort. It is protected by a 10feet high wall and four strong bastions. There is a well, a gunpowder storeroom, grain store room and a Mahapurush temple inside the balekilla. There is also a cave and hidden door inside the fort. It takes about an hour to visit all places on the fort.

See also 
 List of forts in India
 Maratha Navy
 Maratha War of Independence
 Battles involving the Maratha Empire
 Maratha Army
 Military history of India
 List of Maratha dynasties and states
 List of people involved in the Maratha Empire

References 

Buildings and structures of the Maratha Empire
16th-century forts in India